Jacob Alexander Falconer (January 26, 1869 – July 1, 1928) was a one-term congressman from the state of Washington, elected at-large in 1912.

Early years
Born in Ontario, Canada, Falconer moved with his parents to Saugatuck, Michigan, in 1873.
He attended the public schools, and moved to Washburn, Wisconsin  Falconer graduated from Beloit (Wisconsin) Academy in 1890 and later took college work at Beloit College.

Political career
He moved west in 1894 to Everett, Washington, and was in the lumber business and served as mayor of Everett in 1897 and 1898. Falconer was member of the state legislature (1904–1908), and was speaker of the house during the 1907 session. He served as member of the state senate from 1909 to 1912.

Falconer ran for Congress in one of two new at-large seats Progressive in 1912, as Washington's congressional apportionment grew from three to five seats following the 1910 census. He was elected to the Sixty-third Congress and served for one term (March 4, 1913 – March 3, 1915), and was an unsuccessful candidate for the nomination for U.S. Senator on the Progressive ticket in 1914. The nomination went to Ole Hanson, who finished third in a five-man general election and was elected mayor of Seattle in 1918.

After politics
After leaving Washington, D.C., Falconer remained on the East Coast and worked in the ship-brokerage business in New York City from 1915 to 1919. He then moved to Fort Worth, Texas, in 1919 and engaged in road-construction contracting, then to Farmington, New Mexico, in 1925 and was in the oil and gas industry. Falconer died in Wingdale, New York, on July 1, 1928, and 
was interred in Saugatuck Cemetery in Saugatuck, Michigan.

References

External links 
 

 Washington Secretary of State – History Makers – Jacob Falconer

1869 births
1928 deaths
People from Ontario
Canadian emigrants to the United States
Progressive Party (1912) members of the United States House of Representatives from Washington (state)
Members of the Washington House of Representatives
Washington (state) state senators
Mayors of Everett, Washington
People from Saugatuck, Michigan